Sawdah bint Zamʿah was the second wife of Muhammad and therefore regarded as, Umm-ul-Mu'mineen (Arabic: أمّ المؤمنين, romanized: ʾumm al-muʾminīn), "Mother of the Believers".

Early life

Sawdah was born and raised in Mecca in Pre-Islamic Arabia. There is a disagreement as to when she was born. According to one source, when she was married to Muhammad, her age was around 50, other sources claim her age during the marriage to be around 40 to 55 years old, which would only narrow her birthday to around 566-580 CE.
Her father, Zam'ah ibn Qays, was from the Banu Amir ibn Lu'ayy clan of the Quraysh tribe in Mecca. Her mother, Al-Shamus bint Qays, was from the Najjar clan of the Khazraj tribe in Madina. Not much is known about her early life before Islam.

First Husband and First Hijra

She married As-Sakran ibn Amr, who was one of the early converts to Islam. They had at least one son, Abdur Rahman ibn as-Sakran, who much later died in the Battle of Jalula in 637 against the Sassanids.

Migration to Abyssinia
Sawdah and Sakran emigrated to Abyssinia when Muhammad ordered many of the Muslims to perform Hijrah in order to avoid persecution by the Quraysh. Sakran left for Abyssinia by sea with Waqqas. Sawdah was one of the first women to immigrate to Abyssinia in the way of Allah. Few years later they returned to Mecca, where As-Sakran died, and she became a widow for the first time in her life.

Marriage to Muhammad

Few months after the death of Khadijah, Muhammad was suggested to marry again by Khawlah bint Hakim, and she suggested Sawdah and Aisha bint Abi Bakr's names as both widowed and virgin contenders for marriage. Sawdah's described as a tall and large, dark skinned woman, with a jolly, kindly disposition, and just the right person to take care of Muhammad's household and family. So Muhammad gave permission to Khawlah to speak to Abu Bakr and to Sawdah on the subject. Khawlah went straight to Sawdah and said, "Would you like Allah to give you great blessing, Sawdah?" Sawdah asked, "And what is that, Khawlah?" She said, "The Messenger of Allah has sent me to you with a proposal of marriage!" Sawdah tried to contain herself in spite of her utter astonishment and then replied, "I would like that! Go to my father and tell him that." Khawlah went to Zam'ah, a gruff old man, and greeted him and then said, "Muhammad son of Abdullah son of Abdul Muttalib, has sent me to ask for Sawdah in marriage." The old man shouted, "A noble match. What does she say?" Khawlah replied, "She would like that." He told her to call her. When she came, he said, "Sawdah, this woman claims that Muhammad son of Abdullah son of Abdul Muttalib has sent me to ask for you in marriage. It is a noble match. Do you want me to marry you to him?" She accepted, feeling it was a great honor.

Muhammad married Sawdah in the month of Ramadan, in the tenth year of his prophethood (i.e., in April–May 620), a few months after the death of Khadijah. According to Ibn Sa’d, Sawdah died in the year 54 after Hijra, If she lived to become an octogenarian she must have married Muhammad at the age of 27. If she reached the age of 90 then she could not have been older than 37 when she married the prophet who was 50 years old at that time. However, there are sources that put her death in the year 644.
Sawdah went to live in Muhammad's house and immediately took over the care of his daughters and household, while Aisha became betrothed to him and remained in her father's house. There was great surprise in Mecca that Muhammad would choose to marry a widow who wasn't beautiful according to society's standards. Muhammad, however, remembered the trials she had undergone when she had immigrated to Abyssinia, leaving her house and property, and crossed the desert and then the sea for an unknown land out of the desire to preserve her deen.

It was after the Hijrah that the first community of Muslims rapidly grew and flowered and bore fruit.

When Sawdah got older, and some time after Muhammad's marriage to Umm Salama, some sources claim that Muhammad wished to divorce her. According to Ibn Kathir Muhammad was worried that Sawda might be upset about having to compete with so many younger wives, and offered to divorce her. Sawdah offered to give her turn of Muhammad's conjugal visits at night to Aisha, of whom he was very fond of, stating that she "was old, and did not have needs for men; her only desire was to rise on the Day of Judgment as one of his wives". 
While some Muslim historians cite this story as a reason of revelation, citing Quran 4:128, others like Rashid Rida dispute this whole account as "poorly supported", or mursal. Some traditions maintain that Muhammad did not intend to divorce her, but only she feared or thought that he would.

Later life and death

After the death of prophet Muhammad, Sawdah along with other wives received a gift of money annually from the Caliphate, which she spent on charity. She, Aisha, Hafsa, and Safiyya always remained very close. She lived a long life and died in 54 AH in Medina, where she was buried in Jannat-al-Baqi. Ibn Sa'd puts her date of death to the year 674. After her death, Muawiyah I, the reigning first caliph of the Umayyad dynasty, bought her house in Medina for 180,000 dirhams. According to other sources, she died in Medina towards the end of caliph 'Umar's reign in 22 AH, 644 CE.

References

External links
2 Muslims.com
SAWDA bint Zam'a

674 deaths
Wives of Muhammad
Year of birth unknown
6th-century Arabs
7th-century Arabs
Muslim female saints
570 births
Burials at Jannat al-Baqī